Scopula melinau is a moth of the family Geometridae. It is found on Borneo. The habitat consists of dipterocarp forests.

The length of the forewings is about 11 mm.

References

Moths described in 1997
melinau
Moths of Asia